The Lucknow–Bareilly Railway or Lucknow–Bareilly State Railway was owned by the Government of India and worked by the Rohilkund and Kumaon Railway. The Lucknow–Bareilly Railway was formed on 1 January 1891 by merger of Lucknow–Sitapur–Seramow Provincial State Railway and Bareilly–Pilibheet Provincial State Railway. The Lucknow–Bareilly Railway was merged into the Oudh and Tirhut Railway on 1 January 1943.

Conversion to broad gauge 

The railway lines were converted to  broad gauge in 2017.

External links
 Lucknow-Bareilly State Railway on FIBIS

Notes
 Rao, M.A. (1988). Indian Railways, New Delhi: National Book Trust
 Chapter 1 - Evolution of Indian Railways-Historical Background

1891 establishments in India
1943 disestablishments in India
Railway companies established in 1891
Railway companies disestablished in 1943
1943 mergers and acquisitions
Defunct railway companies of India
History of rail transport in Uttar Pradesh
Transport in Lucknow
Transport in Bareilly